Maurice White (December 19, 1941 – February 4, 2016) was an American singer, musician, songwriter, and record producer. He was best known as the founder, leader, main songwriter, and producer of the band Earth, Wind & Fire, and served as the band's co-lead singer with Philip Bailey.

Described as a "visionary" by Vibe and a "mastermind" by Variety, White was nominated for a total of 22 Grammys, of which he won seven. He was inducted into the Rock and Roll Hall of Fame and the Vocal Group Hall of Fame as a member of Earth, Wind & Fire, and was also inducted individually into the Songwriters Hall of Fame. He additionally worked with artists such as Deniece Williams, Cher, The Emotions, Barbra Streisand, Ramsey Lewis, and Neil Diamond.

Biography

Early career
Maurice White was born in Memphis, Tennessee, on December 19, 1941. He grew up in South Memphis, where he lived with his grandmother in the Foote Homes Projects and was a childhood friend of Booker T. Jones and David Porter. Along with Jones, White formed a "cookin' little band" while attending Booker T. Washington High School. He also made frequent trips to Chicago to visit his mother, Edna, and stepfather, Verdine Adams, who was a doctor and occasional saxophonist. During his teenage years, White moved to Chicago where he studied at the Chicago Conservatory of Music, and played drums in local nightclubs. In 1962 he joined The Jazzmen, a student jazz trio at Crane Junior College in Chicago, Illinois formed by 
Louis Satterfield on trombone, Charles Handy on trumpet, and Don Myrick on alto saxophone. The Jazzmen later became the Pharaohs. Satterfield, White, and Handy became studio musicians at Chess Records in Chicago. While at Chess, he played on the records of artists such as Etta James, Chuck Berry, Rotary Connection, Junior Wells, Sonny Stitt, Muddy Waters, the Impressions, the Dells, Betty Everett, Willie Dixon, Sugar Pie DeSanto and Buddy Guy. White also played the drums on Fontella Bass's "Rescue Me" (with Satterfield on bass), Billy Stewart's "Summertime" and Jackie Wilson's "(Your Love Keeps Lifting Me) Higher and Higher".

In June 1966, he left Chess and the Pharaohs to join the Ramsey Lewis Trio, replacing Isaac "Red" Holt as the group's drummer.  Holt and bassist Eldee Young left to form Young-Holt Unlimited. Young was also replaced by Cleveland Eaton. As a member of the Trio, Maurice played on several of their albums. One of these was 1966's Wade in the Water. The album track "Hold It Right There" went on to win a Grammy Award for Best Rhythm & Blues Group Performance, Vocal or Group. With the Trio, White also played on 1966's The Movie Album and 1967's Goin' Latin. He also performed on the Trio's 1968 LPs Dancing in the Street, Up Pops Ramsey Lewis, Mother Nature's Son and Maiden Voyage. While in the group White was introduced in a Chicago drum store to the African thumb piano or kalimba. The track "Uhuru" on the Trio's 1969 LP Another Voyage featured the first recording of White playing the kalimba.

In 1969, White left the Trio and joined his two friends, Wade Flemons and Don Whitehead, to form a songwriting team who wrote songs for commercials in the Chicago area. The three friends got a recording contract with Capitol Records and called themselves the Salty Peppers. They had a moderate hit in the Midwest area with their single "La La Time", but their second single, "Uh Huh Yeah", was not as successful. White then moved from Chicago to Los Angeles, and altered the name of the band to Earth, Wind & Fire, the band's new name reflecting the elements in his astrological chart.

Earth, Wind & Fire

With Maurice as the bandleader and producer of most of the band's albums, EWF earned legendary status winning six Grammy Awards out of 17 nominations,  a star on the Hollywood Boulevard Walk of Fame, and four American Music Awards. The group's albums have sold over 90 million copies worldwide. Other honors bestowed on Maurice as a member of the band included inductions into the Rock and Roll Hall of Fame, the Vocal Group Hall of Fame, The Songwriters Hall of Fame and The NAACP Image Awards Hall of Fame.

White brought the kalimba into mainstream use by incorporating its sound into the music of Earth, Wind & Fire. He was also responsible for expanding the group to include a full horn section at first being the Phenix Horns and then the Earth, Wind & Fire Horns. During 1994 Maurice stopped regularly touring with the band but still occasionally appeared on stage. He retained executive control of the band and was still very active in the music business, producing and recording with the band and other artists.

A website entitled www.Startalk.org was also set up in 1999 in honour of Maurice. Maurice later spoke of an ongoing affliction with Parkinson's disease. Artists such as Steven Tyler of Aerosmith, Boyz II Men, Smokey Robinson, Isaac Hayes, Michael Jackson, Eric Clapton and Tom Morello of Rage Against the Machine posted messages upon the site for White.

With EWF he appeared at several events such as the 2004 Grammy Awards Tribute to Funk. He also performed alongside Alicia Keys at Clive Davis's 2004 pre-Grammy awards party where they performed the band's 1978 hit "September".

Deniece Williams

White was co-producing with Charles Stepney, Deniece Williams' debut album This Is Niecy when Stepney died during the album's recording. Williams was a former backup vocalist for Stevie Wonder's band Wonderlove. The album was the first for Kalimba Productions, a production company also established by White and Stepney in 1976. As such Maurice went on to mostly produce the LP which was eventually released in August 1976 on Columbia Records. This Is Niecy rose to No. 3 on the US Billboard Top Soul Albums and No. 33 on the US Billboard 200 charts. A song off the LP called "Free" got to No. 25 on the US Billboard Hot 100, No. 2 on the US Billboard Hot Soul Songs chart and No. 1 on the UK Pop Singles chart. This Is Niecy has also been certified Gold in the US by the RIAA and Silver in the UK by the BPI.

Maurice went on to also produce Williams' sophomore album Songbird, released in 1977. The album rose to No. 23 on the US Billboard Top Soul Albums chart and No. 5 on the UK Blues & Soul Top British Soul Albums chart. A single entitled "Baby, Baby My Love's All for You" got to No. 13 on the US Billboard Hot Soul Songs chart, No. 5 on the UK Blues & Soul Top British Soul Singles chart and No. 32 on the UK Pop Singles chart.

Williams later issued 1978's That's What Friends Are For on Columbia for Kalimba Productions. She then released 1979's When Love Comes Calling on ARC Records, Maurice's vanity label on Columbia. He also featured as a guest artist on the LP.
The album peaked at No. 27 on the Billboard Top Soul Albums chart. The single, "I've Got the Next Dance", also reached No. 1 on the Billboard Dance Club Play chart.

Williams also issued 1981's My Melody and 1982's Niecy on ARC Records. In a 2007 interview Deniece said: "I loved working with Maurice White ... he taught me the business of music, and planning and executing a plan and executing a show."

The Emotions

After Stax Records became embroiled in financial problems, the girl group the Emotions looked for a new contract and found one with Columbia Records. With Charles Stepney co-producing with White, their third studio album entitled Flowers was issued in 1976. The album got to No. 5 on the Billboard Top Soul albums chart. Flowers has also been certified Gold in the US by the RIAA.

The album's title track got to No. 16 on the Billboard Hot Soul Songs chart. Another single being "I Don't Wanna Lose Your Love" got to Nos. 4 & 13 on the Billboard Dance Club Songs and Hot Soul Songs charts respectively.

Following Charles Stepney's death in 1976, White took over producing the Emotions. During 1977 the group issued their follow up album Rejoice. The album reached No. 1 on the Billboard Top R&B Albums chart and No. 7 on the Billboard 200 chart. Rejoice has also been certified Platinum in the US by the RIAA.

With the LP came the single  "Don't Ask My Neighbors" which got to the top ten on the Billboard R&B singles charts. Another song, "Best of My Love", reached No. 1 on the Billboard Pop and R&B charts. "Best of My Love" won a Grammy for Best R&B Performance By a Duo or Group with Vocals, and an American Music Award for Favorite Soul/R&B Single. "Best of My Love" has also been certified Platinum in the US by the RIAA.

In 1978 The Emotions released their third Columbia album, Sunbeam. The album rose to No. 12 on the Billboard Top Soul Albums chart and No. 40 on the Billboard 200 chart. An album cut called "Smile" reached No. 6 on the Billboard Hot Soul Songs chart. Sunbeam has been certified Gold in the US by the RIAA. The Emotions also received an American Music Award nomination in 1978 for Favorite Soul/R&B Band, Duo or Group.

During 1979 Earth, Wind & Fire collaborated with the Emotions on the single "Boogie Wonderland". The song reached No. 6 on the Billboard Hot 100 chart and No. 2 on the Billboard Hot Soul Songs chart. "Boogie Wonderland" has also been certified Gold in the US by the RIAA. White produced the girl group's 1979 LP Come into Our World which was released on his own Columbia imprint ARC Records. The album rose to No. 35 on the Billboard Top Soul Albums chart. A song from the LP called "What's the Name of Your Love?" also rose to No. 30 in the Billboard Hot R&B Songs chart. White went on to be Grammy nominated in the category of Producer of the Year Non-Classical.

The Emotions went on to guest upon Earth, Wind & Fire's 2003 single "All in the Way". "All in the Way" rose to No. 13 on the Billboard Adult R&B Songs chart and No. 25 on the Billboard Adult Contemporary Songs chart. This track featured upon EWF's 2003 album The Promise which was also produced by Maurice White.

Work with other artists

White also worked with several other famous recording artists. As such he played the drums on former Rotary Connection lead singer Minnie Riperton's 1970 debut album, Come to My Garden. White went on to produce Ramsey Lewis' 1974 album Sun Goddess. The album reached No. 1 on the Billboard Top Soul Albums chart and No. 12 on the Billboard Top Pop Albums chart. Sun Goddess has also been certified Gold in the US by the RIAA. He also produced with Charles Stepney Lewis' 1976 LP Salongo. The album rose to Nos. 7 on the Billboard Jazz Albums & No. 17 on the Billboard Top Soul Albums charts.

White composed on Eumir Deodato's 1978 studio album Love Island. The album got to No. 20 on the Billboard Jazz Albums charts. White later served as the executive producer of the R&B band Pockets' album Take It On Up released in 1978 on Columbia. That album reached no. 22 on the Billboard Top R&B Albums chart. He then guested with Deniece Williams on Weather Report's 1978 album Mr. Gone.
The album was issued on ARC Records, his vanity label at Columbia. Mr. Gone rose to No. 1 on the Billboard Jazz Albums chart.
Weather Report's follow up LPs 8:30, Night Passage and Weather Report were also issued on ARC.

White went on to collaborate with Ramsey Lewis on his 1980 LP Routes and gospel artist Walter Hawkins on his 1980 Grammy nominated album The Hawkins Family. Additionally he composed on Barry Manilow's 1980 album Barry. That album was certified Platinum in the US by the RIAA He also appeared as a guest artist on the Tubes 1983 album Outside Inside.
White later produced Jennifer Holliday's Grammy nominated 1983 LP Feel My Soul.

White produced Barbra Streisand on her 1984 album Emotion. Emotion has been certified Platinum in the US by the RIAA. He also produced Ramsey Lewis on his 1985 album Fantasy. The album reached No. 13 on the Cashbox Jazz Albums chart.
He went on to appear as a guest artist on Lee Ritenour's Grammy nominated 1986 album Earth Run. White later co-produced Pieces of a Dream's 1986 LP Joyride. The album reached No. 3 on the Billboard Traditional Jazz Albums chart and No. 18 on the Billboard Top Soul Albums chart.

White also produced Neil Diamond on his 1986 album Headed for the Future. Headed for the Future has been certified Gold in the US by the RIAA. He worked as a producer with Atlantic Starr on the band's 1987 LP All in the Name of Love. The album has been certified Platinum in the US by the RIAA. He then made a guest appearance on Cher's 1987 self-titled LP. The album has been certified Platinum in the US by the RIAA. As well he played percussion and coproduced Ramsey Lewis's 1987 album Keys to the City. That album got to No. 22 on the Billboard Top Contemporary Jazz Albums chart. White also produced El DeBarge on his 1992 LP In The Storm. The album got to No. 22 on the Blues & Soul Top UK Soul Albums chart.

White collaborated with the Japanese band Dreams Come True on two songs: "Wherever You Are" from their 1994 album Delicious, and "Eternity", which appeared on the soundtrack for the 1994 animated film The Swan Princess.

As well he produced Ramsey Lewis's 1993 album Sky Islands. The album rose to No. 4 on the Billboard Contemporary Jazz Albums chart and No. 6 on the Billboard Top Jazz Albums chart.  He also appeared on Marcus Miller's 1993 album The Sun Don't Lie. The album rose to No. 10 on the Billboard Jazz Albums chart.
White went on to produce the debut album of the jazz group Urban Knights released in 1995 by GRP Records. Urban Knights I featured Ramsey Lewis,  percussionist Omar Hakim, trumpeter Freddie Hubbard, The Emotions and saxophonist Grover Washington, Jr. The album rose to No. 5 on the Billboard Jazz Albums charts.
Within that year he also appeared upon British soul group D'Influence's single "Midnite". The song reached No. 17 on the UK R&B Singles chart.

During 1996 White also established his own record label entitled Kalimba Records. The Urban Knight's sophomore album Urban Knights II was again produced by Maurice. Urban Knights II featured appearances by Ramsey Lewis, Paulinho Da Costa, Verdine White, singer-songwriter and guitarist Jonathan Butler and jazz saxophonist Najee. The album got to No. 7 on the Billboard Jazz Albums chart.   White also arranged for the British girl group Cleopatra on their 1998 album Comin' Atcha!. Comin' Atcha peaked at number 20 on the UK albums chart and was certified Silver in the UK by the BPI.

White was the executive producer of saxophonist Paul Taylor's 2000 LP Undercover. The album got to No. 6 on the Billboard Jazz Albums chart. He also featured as a guest artist on Jazz saxophonist Kirk Whalum's 2003 album Into My Soul. As well White guested with French jazz band Nojazz on the tracks "Nobody Else" and "Kool" off their 2006 album Have Fun. "Kool" marked the first time White collaborated with his friend Stevie Wonder.

White served as the executive producer of an EWF tribute album entitled Interpretations: Celebrating The Music Of Earth, Wind & Fire which was released in March 2007 by Stax Records. The album rose to no. 28 on the Billboard Top R&B/Hip-Hop Albums chart. On the LP were featured artists such as Chaka Khan, Musiq Soulchild, Mint Condition, Kirk Franklin and Angie Stone. Kirk Franklin's cover of "September" reached No. 17 on the Billboard Adult R&B Songs chart and No. 26 on the Billboard Hot Gospel Songs chart. As well Dwele's remake of "That's The Way Of The World" and Meshell Ndegeocello's cover of "Fantasy" were both Grammy nominated for Best Urban/Alternative Performance.

White executively produced jazz musician Brian Culbertson's album Bringing Back The Funk which was released in 2008 on GRP Records. Bringing Back the Funk rose to No. 3 on the Billboard Jazz Albums chart and No. 18 on the Top R&B/Hip Hop Albums chart. The album featured guest artists such as Ray Parker Jr., Sheldon Reynolds, Bootsy Collins, Larry Graham, Ledisi, Ronnie Laws, Musiq Soulchild, Bernie Worrell, Maceo Parker, Larry Dunn and Gerald Albright. A song from the album called "Always Remember" got to No. 1 on the Billboard Smooth Jazz Songs chart. Culbertson revealed in an interview that he is "...still in disbelief. I have learned so much from (Maurice) and he actually said that he learned a lot from me. It was incredible to work with him."

Solo work

During 1985, White released a self titled solo album on Columbia. Robin Denselow of The Guardian called the album a "lush collection of self produced dance tracks, and the occasional ballad, with synths and drum programming immaculately in place, and the vocals as classy as ever". J.D. Considine of Musician also said the "Given his status as Earth, Wind & Fire's Shining Star, it comes as no surprise that White's first solo project sounds a lot like classic EW&F: tight, focused and punchy. But while White remembers to sink a hook into every verse and chorus, the emphasis here is on subtlety and sophistication as he works his way from R&B basics, from the studio mechanics of 'Switch on Your Radio' to the modified doo wop of 'Stand By Me', with a sense of craft that makes slickness irrelevant". The album rose to number 12 on the Billboard Top Soul Albums chart. Appearing upon the LP was a cover of Ben E. King's "Stand by Me", with a guest appearance by jazz saxophonist Gerald Albright.

White's version of "Stand by Me" got to No. 6 on the Billboard Hot Soul Singles and No. 11 on the Billboard Adult Contemporary Songs chart.

Another song from the album called "I Need You" rose to No. 20 on the Billboard Adult Contemporary Songs chart and No. 30 on the Billboard Hot Soul Singles chart.

In 2019, an album of previously unreleased recordings, titled Manifestation, was released. This album consists of selected tracks worked on by White and songwriter/producer Preston Glass over a period of nearly 30 years.

Screen and stage
White wrote and produced songs for the feature films Coming to America, A Low Down Dirty Shame, and Gatchaman OVA. He also composed music for the television series Life Is Wild. During 2006 he worked with Gregory Hines' brother, Maurice upon the Broadway play Hot Feet. White and Allee Willis also wrote several new songs for the play.

In the movie BAADASSSSS!, the actor Khalil Kain portrayed a young Maurice White leading the early incarnation of Earth, Wind & Fire. Released at the 2004 Sundance Film Festival, the film was based on Melvin Van Peebles' struggles to film and distribute the movie Sweet Sweetback's Baadasssss Song. His son, Mario Van Peebles both directed the film and portrayed his father in the lead role. White also won an ASCAP Award as a composer of, "That's The Way Of The World", with it being a theme song of the sitcom Hearts Afire.

Personal life
White was a married father of three children: one daughter, Hemeya, and two sons, Kahbran and Eden. He owned two homes in California, one in Carmel Valley and the other a four-level condominium in Los Angeles. He was a fan of basketball and tennis. He went by the nickname of "Reese". His younger half-brother, Verdine White, an original member of Earth, Wind & Fire, still tours with the band as its bassist and a backing vocalist. Additionally, their brother Fred joined the band in 1974, when the band recorded "Devotion".

Death
On the morning of February 4, 2016, White died in his sleep at his Los Angeles home from the effects of Parkinson's disease. He was 74 years old. His brother Verdine said, "My brother, hero and best friend Maurice White passed away peacefully last night in his sleep. While the world has lost another great musician and legend, our family asks that our privacy is respected as we start what will be a very difficult and life-changing transition in our lives. Thank you for your prayers and well-wishes."

Legacy
Along with EW&F, Maurice White was posthumously bestowed with a Grammy Lifetime Achievement Award at the annual Grammy Awards ceremony on February 15, 2016, at the Staples Center, Los Angeles, California. At the ceremony Stevie Wonder and Pentatonix performed a rendition of "That's the Way of the World" in tribute to White.

Artists such as Stokley Williams, Richard Marx, Raphael Saadiq, Larry Blackmon, and Nate Dogg have also named White as an influence.

Awards and honors

Grammy Awards
The Grammy Awards are awarded annually by the National Academy of Recording Arts and Sciences of the United States. White received seven Grammys from 22 nominations.

|-
|rowspan="2"|1976
||Earth, Wind & Fire
|Best Instrumental Composition
|
|-
||Best of My Love
|Best Rhythm & Blues Song
|
|-
|rowspan="2"|1978
||Got to Get You into My Life
|Best Instrumental Arrangement Accompanying Vocalist(s)
|
|-
||Fantasy
|Best R&B Song
|
|-
||1979
||Maurice White
|Producer of the Year
|

Other awards
Four American Music Awards.
The BET Lifetime Achievement Award
An ASCAP Rhythm And Soul Award
An ASCAP Pop Music Award
Three NAACP Image Awards
An ASCAP Rhythm and Soul Heritage Award
A Lifetime Achievement Award from the Jazz Foundation of America.
Inducted into the Rock and Roll Hall of Fame
Inducted into the Memphis Music Hall of Fame
A Star on the Hollywood Walk Of Fame
On May 16, 2005, Maurice was honored by Los Angeles Valley College as the first recipient of their Cultural Achievement Award Of Excellence.
On May 10, 2008, Maurice White and Philip Bailey received honorary doctorates from the Berklee College of Music.
On May 20, 2008, Maurice, Phillip Bailey, Ralph Johnson and Verdine White received honorary doctorates from Columbia College of Chicago.

Autobiography
On September 13, 2016, White's autobiography, Maurice White: My Life With Earth, Wind & Fire, by Maurice White and Herb Powell, was released, including a foreword by Steve Harvey and an afterword by David Foster.

See also
Albums produced by Maurice White

References

External links

Kalimba Entertainment
Kalimba Music
Official Earth, Wind & Fire Website

1941 births
2016 deaths
African-American drummers
African-American record producers
African-American male singer-songwriters
American bandleaders
American funk drummers
American funk singers
American jazz drummers
American male pop singers
American music arrangers
American baritones
American soul singers
Neurological disease deaths in California
Deaths from Parkinson's disease
Earth, Wind & Fire members
Grammy Award winners
Musicians from Memphis, Tennessee
People from Carmel Valley Village, California
Record producers from California
Record producers from Tennessee
Rhythm and blues drummers
Singer-songwriters from Tennessee
Soul drummers
Tennessee State University alumni
American male jazz musicians
The Pharaohs members
Jazz musicians from California
20th-century African-American male singers
Singer-songwriters from California